Angelo Salvatore Rossitto (February 18, 1908 – September 21, 1991) was an American actor and voice artist. He had dwarfism and was 2'11" (89 cm) tall, and was often billed as Little Angie or Moe. Angelo first appeared in silent films opposite Lon Chaney and John Barrymore. On screen, he portrayed everything from dwarfs, midgets, gnomes and pygmies as well as monsters, villains and aliens, with appearances in more than 70 films.

Biography
Rossitto was born in Omaha, Nebraska to Salvatore Rossitto and Carmela Caniglia, both born in Carlentini, Province of Siracusa, Sicily, Italy and had a sister, Josephine Rossitto.

He was discovered by John Barrymore and made his screen debut opposite Barrymore in The Beloved Rogue (1927). That same year he appeared in Warner Brother's Old San Francisco. He appeared in the controversial 1932 film Freaks directed by Tod Browning, and another controversial film, 1938's Child Bride. During the 1940s, he appeared in several poverty row movies starring Bela Lugosi. He appeared frequently in television series and mini-series, particularly best known for the police drama Baretta, and his later film roles included appearances in Alex in Wonderland (1970), Brain of Blood (1971), Dracula vs. Frankenstein (1971), Little Cigars (1973), and Fairy Tales (1978). His last major role was as "Master" opposite Mel Gibson in Mad Max Beyond Thunderdome (1985).

Popular culture
Rossitto appears alongside singer/songwriter Tom Waits and Lee Kolima on the cover art of Waits' 1983 album Swordfishtrombones, which pays homage to his performance in Freaks. He also appears on the cover of Bob Dylan's album The Basement Tapes.

Filmography

The Beloved Rogue (1927) as Beppo - the Dwarf (film debut)
Old San Francisco (1927) as Chang Loo - the Dwarf
While the City Sleeps (1928) as Member of Skeeter's Gang (uncredited)
The Viking (1928) as Viking Dwarf (uncredited)
Seven Footprints to Satan (1929) as The Dwarf
One Stolen Night (1929) as The Dwarf
The Mysterious Island (1929) as Underwater Creature (uncredited)
The Big House (1930) as Inmate (uncredited)
The Phantom of Paris (1931) as Prisoner (uncredited)
Freaks (1932) as Angeleno
The Sign of the Cross (1932) as Impaled Pygmy (uncredited)
 Meet the Champ (1933, Short) as Midget 
Carnival Lady (1933) as Dwarf (uncredited)
I Believed in You (1934) as Greenwich Village Waiter (uncredited)
Babes in Toyland (1934) as Elmer - Second Little Pig/1st Sandman in Cave (uncredited)
Dante's Inferno (1935) as Passenger in Boiler Room (uncredited)
A Midsummer Night's Dream (1935) as Gnome (uncredited)
Stand-In (1937) as Little Person Entering Studio Gate (uncredited)
Child Bride (1938) as Angelo
Mr. Wong in Chinatown (1939) as Mute Dwarf (uncredited)
Doomed to Die (1940) as Newsboy #3 in Montage (uncredited)
Spooks Run Wild (1941) as Luigi
Hellzapoppin' (1941) as Dwarf Devil (uncredited)
The Corpse Vanishes (1942) as Toby
The Spider Woman (1944) as Obongo - Pygmy (uncredited)
Ali Baba and the Forty Thieves (1944) as Arab Dwarf (uncredited)
Lady in the Dark (1944) as Bunny, Midget (uncredited)
Two Smart People (1946) as Street Musician (uncredited)
Scared to Death (1947) as Indigo
The Sin of Harold Diddlebock (1947) as Midget (uncredited)
Samson and Delilah (1949) - Midget at Arena (uncredited)
The Baron of Arizona (1950) as Angie - Gypsy
Pygmy Island (1950) as Pygmy in Cave (uncredited)
The Bandit Queen (1950) as Nino
The Greatest Show on Earth (1952) as Midget (uncredited)
Mesa of Lost Women (1953) as Dwarf Lab Assistant (uncredited)
Jungle Moon Men (1955) -as Smallest Moon-Man (uncredited)
Dementia (1955) as Newsboy (uncredited)
Carousel (1956) as Midget (uncredited)
Invasion of the Saucer Men (1957) as Saucer Man
The Story of Mankind (1957) as Dwarf in Nero's Court (uncredited)
The Wild and the Innocent (1959) as Midget (uncredited)
Pocketful of Miracles (1961) as Angie (uncredited)
The Magic Sword (1962) as 2nd Dwarf (uncredited)
Confessions of an Opium Eater (1962) as Newspaper Boy (uncredited)
The Wonderful World of the Brothers Grimm (1962) as Dwarf (uncredited)
Requiem for a Heavyweight (1962) as Midget Wrestler Outside Wrestling Ring (uncredited)
Terrified (1963) as Midget (uncredited)
The Perils of Pauline (1967) as Pygmy Leader's Assistant (uncredited)
The Trip (1967) as Dwarf in Forest Fantasy (uncredited)
Doctor Dolittle (1967) as Dwarf (uncredited)
Pufnstuf (1970) as Seymore Spider / Clang
Alex in Wonderland (1970) as Fellini #1
Brain of Blood (1971) as Dorro
Dracula vs. Frankenstein (1971) as Grazbo
Little Cigars (1973) as Angelo
The Clones (1973) as Man at Phone Booth
The Master Gunfighter (1975) as Side show midget
I Wonder Who's Killing Her Now? (1975) as Little Pianist/Newsboy
Fairy Tales (1978) as Otto
The Lord of the Rings (1978) as Character Actor (voice)
The Dark (1979) as Angie (uncredited)
Galaxina (1980) as Monster from Egg
Can't Stop the Music (1980) as Fruit seller (uncredited)
Smokey Bites the Dust (1981) as Desk Clerk
Something Wicked This Way Comes (1983) as Little Person #1
Mad Max Beyond Thunderdome (1985) as The Master
From a Whisper to a Scream (1987) as Tinker 
 The Other Side of the Wind (2018) as himself (final film role, released posthumously)

See also
 Little People of America

References

External links

1908 births
1991 deaths
20th-century American male actors
Actors with dwarfism
American people of Italian descent
Burials at Forest Lawn Memorial Park (Hollywood Hills)
Male actors from Omaha, Nebraska